Khelifa Benmessaoud (23 September 1951) is a former professional Algerian footballer who played as a midfielder.

Life and career

International
Benmessaoud played five games All of them in 1973 Palestine Cup of Nations first cap was against United Arab Emirates in group stage after that and against South Yemen he scored his only two goals, the last game was against Syria in Semifinal.

References

External links
 

1951 births
Algerian footballers
Algeria international footballers
People from Tiaret Province
JSM Tiaret players
USM Alger players
Stade Malherbe Caen players
Living people
Association football midfielders
21st-century Algerian people